Basil Dignam (24 October 1905 – 31 January 1979) was an English character actor.

Basil Dignam was born in Sheffield, West Riding of Yorkshire. Before the acting, he tried many jobs, from a company clerk to a journalist. He acted on film and television between 1948 and 1978. He often appeared as an authority figure, such as Mr Justice Poynter in Crown Court, as a police officer, army general or peer. Television appearances include The Prisoner: Checkmate (1967) and The Champions (1968), as Sir Frederick in episode 2 "The Invisible Man".

Personal life
He was married to actress Mona Washbourne from 1940 until his death in 1979. His brother Mark Dignam was also a professional actor. Basil Dignam died, aged 73, in Westminster, London.

Selected filmography

 Maytime in Mayfair (1949) – Commissionaire (uncredited)
 Smart Alec (1951) – Defending Counsel
 Two on the Tiles (1951) – Ship's Captain
 The Lady with a Lamp (1951)
 Appointment with Venus (1951) – R.A.M.C. Captain
 His Excellency (1952) – Security Officer
 Hammer the Toff (1952) – Superintendent
 There Was a Young Lady (1953)
 Carrington V.C. (1954)
 The Quatermass Xperiment (1955) – Sir Lionel Dean (uncredited)
 They Can't Hang Me (1955) – Wing Commander Riddle
 Touch and Go (1955) – Stevens
 The Narrowing Circle (1956) – George Pacey
 Private's Progress (1956) – Col. Martin (uncredited)
 Port of Escape (1956) – Det. Insp. Crawford
 The Intimate Stranger (1956) – Dr. Gray
 Reach for the Sky (1956) – Air Ministry Doctor (uncredited)
 The Weapon (1956) – (uncredited)
 The Counterfeit Plan (1957) – Police Commissioner
 You Pay Your Money (1957) – Currie
 Brothers in Law (1957) – Mr. Justice Emery
 Yangtse Incident: The Story of H.M.S. Amethyst (1957) – Sir Lionel Henry Lamb, British Ambassador at Nanking
 Man in the Shadow (1957) – Bit Part (uncredited)
 Three Sundays to Live (1957) – Davitt
 The Depraved (1957) – Tom Wilton
 Son of a Stranger (1957) – Dr. Delaney
 The Safecracker (1958) – Air Vice Marshal
 Innocent Sinners (1958) – Mr. Dyson – Olivia's Solicitor (uncredited)
 Up the Creek (1958) – Coombes
 The Spaniard's Curse (1958) – Guy Stevenson (uncredited)
 A Cry from the Streets (1958) – Police Inspector (uncredited)
 Carry On Sergeant (1958) – Third Specialist
 Further Up the Creek (1958) – Flagship Commander
 I Only Arsked! (1958) – (uncredited)
 Corridors of Blood (1958) – Chairman
 Room at the Top (1959) – Priest (uncredited)
 Carlton-Browne of the F.O. (1959) – Security Officer
 Sapphire (1959) – Doctor Burgess (uncredited)
 I'm All Right Jack (1959) – Minister of Labour
 A Touch of Larceny (1959) – Lt. Cmdr. Evans at P.R.O. (uncredited)
 The Spider's Web (1960) – Hugo
 Suspect (1960) – Dr Childs
 The Pure Hell of St Trinian's (1960) – Army Officer
 Sentenced for Life (1960) – Ralph Thompson
 Gorgo (1961) – Admiral Brooks
 The Secret Partner (1961) – Lyle
The Fourth Square (1961) - Inspector Forbes
 The Court Martial of Major Keller (1961) – Morrell
 Fate Takes a Hand (1961) – Wheeler
 Life for Ruth (1962) – Lawyer Mapleton
 Lawrence of Arabia (1962) – Cavalry General at Field Briefing (uncredited)
 Seven Seas to Calais (1962) – Sir Francis Walsingham
 Master Spy (1963) – Richard Horton
 Heavens Above! (1963) – Prison Governor
 80,000 Suspects (1963) – Medical Officer Boswell
 Ring of Spies (1964) – 2nd Member at Lord's (uncredited)
 Joey Boy (1965) – General
 The Amorous Adventures of Moll Flanders (1965) – Lawyer
 Rotten to the Core (1965) – The General
 Where the Spies Are (1965) – Major Harding
 Naked Evil (1966) – Jim Benson
 The Jokers (1967) – Bank Manager
 Cuckoo Patrol (1967) – Snodgrass
 I'll Never Forget What's'isname (1967)
 Assignment K (1968) – Howlett
 Twisted Nerve (1968) – Doctor
 Laughter in the Dark (1969) – Dealer
 Battle of Britain (1969) – Tactical Records Officer (uncredited)
 The Great White Hope (1970) – English Official (uncredited)
 10 Rillington Place (1971) – Medical Board
 Persuasion (1971) - Sir Walter Elliot
 A Lizard in a Woman's Skin (1971) – The Commissioner (uncredited)
 Young Winston (1972) – Joseph Chamberlain
 Soft Beds, Hard Battles (1974) – Brigadier
 ‘’Edward the Seventh’’ (1975) - Prime Minister Asquith

References

External links
 

1905 births
1979 deaths
English male film actors
English male television actors
Male actors from Sheffield
20th-century English male actors